Linda Troyekens (born 11 May 1960) is a former Belgian racing cyclist. She finished in second place in the Belgian National Road Race Championships in 1996.

References

External links

1960 births
Living people
Belgian female cyclists
People from Asse
Cyclists from Flemish Brabant